Krasnoye Plamya is a rural locality (a settlement) and the administrative center of Krasnoplamenskoye Rural Settlement, Alexandrovsky District, Vladimir Oblast, Russia. The population was 509 as of 2010. There are 17 streets.

Geography 
Krasnoye Plamya is located 42 km northwest of Alexandrov (the district's administrative centre) by road. Konishchevo is the nearest rural locality.

References 

Rural localities in Alexandrovsky District, Vladimir Oblast